The 6th constituency of Borsod-Abaúj-Zemplén County is one of the single member constituencies of the National Assembly, the national legislature of Hungary. The constituency standard abbreviation: Borsod-Abaúj-Zemplén 06. OEVK.

Since 2020, it has been represented by Zsófia Koncz of the Fidesz–KDNP party alliance.

Geography
The 6th constituency is located in eastern part of Borsod-Abaúj-Zemplén County.

List of municipalities
The constituency includes the following municipalities:

Members
The constituency was first represented by László Varga of the Fidesz from 2014 to 2018. In the 2018 election Ferenc Koncz of the Fidesz was elected representative until his death in 2020. In the by-election of 2020 Zsófia Koncz of the Fidesz was elected representative and she was re-elected in 2022.

References

Borsod-Abauj-Zemplen 6th